Albera is a genus of leafhoppers belonging to the family Cicadellidae, containing a single described species, Albera picea.

References

Cicadellidae